The 1940 Dayton Flyers football team was an American football team that represented the University of Dayton as an independent during the 1940 college football season. In their 18th season under head coach Harry Baujan, the Flyers compiled a 6–3 record. The team played its home games at University of Dayton Stadium.

Center Duncan Obee was selected as a first-team player on the United Press All-Ohio team. Tackle Johnny Humm received first-team honors on the Associated Press All-Ohio team.

Schedule

References

Dayton Flyers
Dayton Flyers football seasons
Dayton Flyers football